Constantia is a genus of extremely small sea snails, marine gastropod mollusks or micromollusks in the family Vanikoridae.

Species
Species within the genus Constantia include:
Constantia acutocostata Bandel & Kowalke, 1997
Constantia elegans A. Adams, 1860

References

 Warén A. & Bouchet P. (1988) A new species of Vanikoridae from the western Mediterranean, with remarks on the Northeast Atlantic species of the family. Bollettino Malacologico 24(5-8): 73-100.

Vanikoridae
Gastropod genera